Swass is the debut album by Sir Mix-a-Lot. It was released in 1988 on Nastymix and re-released on CD by Def American Recordings. The album featured the singles "Posse on Broadway", "Square Dance Rap", "Iron Man" (a rap metal version of the Black Sabbath song featuring the band Metal Church) and "Rippn'". In 1990, the album received a platinum certification by the Recording Industry Association of America.

According to Sir Mix-a-Lot, the word "swass" originally was an inside joke with no meaning in itself.  After the album's release, the word came to mean "Some Wild Ass Silly Shit".

The hook of the song "Swass" is reprised in "Don't Cha" by Busta Rhymes and CeeLo Green, becoming a world hit recorded by the Pussycat Dolls.

Track listing
The 1988 vinyl and CD issues on Nastymix Records contained the same track listing. The 1991 CD reissue on Def American Records added two bonus tracks, "Attack on the Stars" and "F the BS".

Personnel
 Anthony Ray - performer, producer, engineering, programming
 Ed Locke - executive producer
 Ron McMaster - mastering

Samples
Posse on Broadway
"Nightclubbing" by Iggy Pop
Gold
"Dopeman" by N.W.A
Rippin'
"Cars" by Gary Numan
"Numbers" by Kraftwerk
"Tour De France" by Kraftwerk
Square Dance Rap
"Rock Me Baby" by B.B. King
F the BS
"Chase" by Giorgio Moroder

See also
1988 in music

References

1988 debut albums
Sir Mix-a-Lot albums
American Recordings (record label) albums
Nastymix Records albums